The Chimes of Midnight is a Big Finish Productions audio drama based on the long-running British science fiction television series Doctor Who. This audio play was broadcast on digital radio station BBC 7 in four weekly parts, starting on 17 December 2005, and has been rebroadcast on the same channel beginning on 17 December 2006, and again on 26 and 27 September 2007.

Plot
An Edwardian home, Christmas 1906. Or is it? The Doctor and Charley are caught in a mysterious house outside of time and when the grandfather clock strikes, someone will get murdered. Can the Doctor unmask the murderer? Or is something far more sinister at work?

Cast
The Doctor — Paul McGann
Charley Pollard — India Fisher
Edith — Louise Rolfe
Shaughnessy — Lennox Greaves
Mrs Baddeley — Sue Wallace
Frederick — Robert Curbishley
Mary — Juliet Warner

Notes

 This is Charley's last chronological Doctor Who story to be broadcast on BBC Radio 7, although India Fisher continues to play her on a vast number of Big Finish commercial releases. The next chronological Doctor Who radio play to be broadcast by the BBC was Blood of the Daleks featuring the Eighth Doctor and new companion Lucie Miller (played by Sheridan Smith).
 The names of the characters Shaughnessy and Mrs Baddeley are derived from Alfred Shaughnessy and Angela Baddeley, the script editor and the actress who played the cook Mrs Bridges in the famed British 70s drama series Upstairs, Downstairs which took place in an Edwardian townhouse. Other Upstairs, Downstairs influences includes Edith's similarity with the dimwitted scullery maid Ruby Finch.

External links
Big Finish Productions - The Chimes of Midnight

2002 audio plays
Eighth Doctor audio plays
Radio plays based on Doctor Who
2005 radio dramas
Audio plays by Robert Shearman
Fiction set in 1906
Black comedy
Absurdist fiction
Surreal comedy radio series